HOME is a compilation album from American political activism organization Hip Hop Caucus.  Announced on 14 November 2014, and released via iTunes on 2 December 2014, the albums features songs from prominent artists such as Elle Varner, Ne-Yo and Crystal Waters.  The first single from the album, "Mercy Mercy Me" by recording artist Antonique Smith was released on 20 September 2014.

Track listing 

‡ Members of American rock band Queen of Kings

References 

2014 compilation albums
Hip hop albums by American artists
Hip hop compilation albums